Larter is a surname. Notable people with the surname include:

Adam Larter, British comedian
Ali Larter (born 1976), American actress
Clara Larter (1847-1936), English botanist
David Larter (born 1940), Scottish cricketer
Lorna Larter (born 1932), Australian cricketer
Pat Larter (1936–1996), Australian artist
Peter Larter (born 1944), England rugby union player
Richard Larter (born 1929), Australian painter
Rob Larter, British geophysicist
Robert Austin Larter (1925–2015), Canadian politician
Steve Larter, Canadian geochemist
Tyler Larter (born 1968), Canadian ice hockey player